Paul Newton may refer to:
Paul Newton (artist), Australian painter
Paul Newton (DJ), British electronic dance music DJ and producer
Paul Newton (musician) (born 1948), British rock musician
Paul Raymond Newton, British Army officer 1975–2012
Paul Newton (politician) (born 1960), Republican member of the North Carolina State Senate